Doris Frema Wiredu (born 1 February 1964) is a retired Ghanaian female track and field athlete who specialised in 100 metres. She won a gold medal in the 1984 African Championships in the event, and two silvers in 100 metres and 400 metres events in the 1985 edition. Her personal best in 100 metres was 11.75, set in 1985. She also competed for Ghana in the 1984 Summer Olympics in Los Angeles as part of Ghana's 4×100 metres relay women's team, which finished 5th in its semi-final heat, without progressing to the final round.

International competitions

References

External links

1964 births
Living people
Ghanaian female sprinters
Olympic athletes of Ghana
Athletes (track and field) at the 1984 Summer Olympics
Olympic female sprinters
20th-century Ghanaian women
21st-century Ghanaian women
Ghanaian sportspeople
Ghanaian sportswomen